The West Grey Police are the police service for the Municipality of West Grey in southwestern Ontario. West Grey is an amalgamated municipality, consisting of the former townships of Bentinck, Glenelg and Normanby, the former village of Neustadt, and the former town of Durham. West Grey is geographically the largest municipality in Grey County, with a population of approximately 12,000.

The West Grey Police were formed in 2001, after the disbandment of the Town of Durham Police. All serving members immediately became members of the new service, along with several new members.  The townships of Bentinck, Glenelg and Normanby, and the villages of Neustadt and Ayton, previously policed by the Ontario Provincial Police, now became the responsibility of the West Grey Police.  The police service in headquartered in the Town of Durham.

Members
The service consists of:
 Chief of Police
 1 Inspector 
 3 Sergeants  
 16 Constables
 1 Special Constable 
 three part-time   Constables
 1 Auxiliary Sgt
 3 Auxiliary Constables

Chiefs of police
 A. Paul Metcalfe (2001–2005) - also the last chief of the Town of Durham Police
 Rene M. Berger (2005–2016)
 Robert G. Martin (2016–present)

Stations

 Durham - main station and headquarters
 Ayton - sub-station

References

External links

Grey County